David Solomon Birdsall (July 16, 1838 – December 30, 1896) was an American professional baseball player. He played for the Boston Red Stockings from 1871 to 1873 as an outfielder and catcher.

Baseball career
Birdsall first played in the National Association of Base Ball Players, for several teams between 1858 and 1869. He then played in the National Association of Professional Base Ball Players (commonly known as the National Association) for the Boston Red Stockings during 1871–1873. He was a member of the 1872 championship team, which finished first in the National Association with a record of 39–8. In 48 games with Boston during three seasons, Birdsall compiled a .264 batting average.

Personal life
Birdsall served with the 87th New York Volunteer Infantry in the American Civil War from June 1861 to July 1865. He died in Boston in December 1896.

References

Sources

1838 births
1896 deaths
19th-century baseball players
Baseball players from New York City
Baseball outfielders
Baseball catchers
Morrisania Unions players
Washington Nationals (NABBP) players
Boston Red Stockings players
Union Army soldiers